Library Lion is a New York Times best-selling children's book, written by Michelle Knudsen, illustrated by Kevin Hawkes, and published in 2006 by Candlewick Press.
It is suitable for children ages 4–7.

Plot summary
Miss Merriweather, the head librarian, is very particular about rules in the library. No running is allowed and you must be quiet. But when a lion comes to the library one day, no one is sure what to do. There aren't any rules about lions in the library. Furthermore, as it turns out, this lion seems very well suited to library visiting. His big feet are quiet on the library floor. He makes a comfy backrest for the children during story hour. And he never roars in the library, at least not anymore. But when something terrible happens, the lion quickly comes to the rescue in the only way he knows how.

The Library Lion was written as a tribute to libraries.

Critical reception
In School Library Journal Kathy Krasniewicz called Library Lion "a winsome pairing of text and illustration" adding that it is a "natural for storytime and a first purchase for every collection".

Awards
Library Lion has won the following awards and honors:
 Junior Library Guild Selection.[4]
 NAIBA (New Atlantic Independent Booksellers Association): 2007 Picture Book of the Year
 School Library Journal Best Books of 2006
 Amazon.com Best Picture Book of 2006
 Time of Wonder Award from the Maine Discovery Museum
 Book Sense Book of the Year Children's Illustrated Honor Book
 Publishers Weekly Cuffie Award
 Oppenheim Toy Portfolio 2007 Platinum Award
 Nick Jr. Family Magazine Best Books of the Year
 Child Magazine's Best Children's Book Award
 Winter 2006–2007 Book Sense Children's Picks List Selection
 2006 Wilde Picture Book Award
 Irma S. and James H. Black Honor Book[5]
 Arkansas Diamond Primary Book Award Honor Book (2008-2009)
 Patricia Gallagher Children's Choice Picture Book Award Nominee (2011)[6]
 The Sakura Medal (2008)[7]
 Nebraska Golden Sower Award (2008-2009)[8]
 Norfolk Libraries' Children's Choice Award (2008)[9]
 Show Me Readers Award Nominee (2008-2009)[10]
 Pennsylvania Young Reader's Choice Award Nominee (2009)[11]
 South Carolina Picture Book Award nominee (2008-2009)[12][13]
 ABC Best Books for Children Catalog Selection[14][15]
 Kentucky Bluegrass Award nominee (2008)[16]
 Utah Beehive Picture Book Award nominee (2008)[17]
 Tennessee Volunteer State Book Award Master List (2008-2009)[18]
 Montana Treasure State Award winner (2009)[19]

References

External links
"Library Lion Lesson Plan", Scholastic, Jeremy Brunaccioni

2006 children's books
American children's books
American picture books
Children's fiction books
English-language books
Books about lions
Fictional children
Fictional librarians
Children's books about friendship
United States in fiction
Works set in libraries